Nuvolera is a town and comune in the province of Brescia, in Lombardy. As of 2011 Nuvolera had a population of 4,693.

Sources

Cities and towns in Lombardy